Agra liv is a species of carabid beetle found in Costa Rica and Panama. It is named after the actress Liv Tyler, starlet of the movie Armageddon, because the "existence of this species of elegant beetle is dependent upon the rainforest not undergoing an armageddon."

The holotype was collected in Costa Rica and first described to science in 2002.

See also
List of organisms named after famous people (born 1950–present)

References

Lebiinae
Beetles of Central America
Beetles described in 2002
Taxa named by Terry Erwin